Kevueli Bulamainaivalu is a Fijian police officer, who held the position of Assistant Commissioner of Police - Crime, before he was dismissed following the military coup that took place on 5 December 2006.

Before the coup Bulamainaivalu was tasked with investigating the Fiji coup of 2000.

References

Year of birth missing (living people)
Living people
Fijian police officers
I-Taukei Fijian people